Sourav, alternatively Saurav or Sourabh, is a common Indian masculine first name. It means fragrance. Sourav is a common name among Assamese, Bengali, Oriya and Hindi speaking people.

Notable people with the name include:

 Sourav Chatterjee, Indian mathematician
 Sourav Das, Indian footballer
 Sourav De (born 1974), Indian film director, producer and screenwriter
 Sourav Dubey, Indian cricketer
 Sourav Ganguly (born 1972), Indian cricketer and BCCI president
 Saurav Ghosal, Indian squash player
 Sourav Mishra, Indian journalist
 Sourav Pal, Indian professor of chemistry
 Sourav Sarkar, Indian cricketer
 Sourabh Vij, Indian shot putter

Indian masculine given names